Judith del Rosario-Cajes (born July 20, 1957) is a Filipino politician who is the first woman mayor elected in Trinidad, Bohol, Philippines.

Biography

She was born in Getafe, Bohol, Philippines to former Buenavista, Bohol Mayor Alfonso  del Rosario and Beatriz Jumao-as.

Cajes worked at the Telecom Tagbilaran City and rendered service as local legislative staff at the Bohol Provincial government in 1998–2001.

On July 1, 2007, she was elected mayor of Trinidad, Bohol.

She is married to Rep. Roberto Cajes with whom she has five children: Michael, Frances Bobbith, a former SK Bohol president, Jane Censoria Cajes, the SK national president, Joan and Robie Rose.

References 

People from Bohol
1957 births
Mayors of places in Bohol
Women mayors of places in the Philippines
Living people
Lakas–CMD (1991) politicians